The H series was the third series of rapid transit rolling stock used in the subway system of Toronto, Ontario, Canada. They were built in six production sets, named H1 to H6, from 1965 to 1990 in Thunder Bay, Ontario, for the Toronto Transit Commission (TTC).

The first five sets were manufactured by Hawker Siddeley Canada until 1979, when the company was purchased by the Urban Transportation Development Corporation (UTDC), which then took over production. They operated alongside their predecessor models, the M series, while the H6 trains replaced the last remaining G-series trains in 1990.

All H-series cars were manufactured in a facility Hawker Siddeley inherited from Canadian Car & Foundry, which had earlier produced PCC streetcars for the TTC's streetcar network. The facility was taken over by Bombardier Transportation in 1991, which has continued to produce all subsequent rolling stock for the subway. They include the successor of the H series, the T series, introduced in 1996 and which replaced earlier H-series (H1, H2, and the prototype H3) trains by 1999. The remaining H4, H5, and H6 trains were replaced between 2011 and 2014 by the newest model, the Toronto Rocket.

History

Based on the  M1, the early H-series cars improved on the design, notably by enlarging the operator's cab and using a single-handle controller. Revisions were made to the designs, and each production model in the H series improved on the last. The H5s were the first subway cars in the TTC fleet to use chopper controls and were also the first cars with regenerative braking and air-conditioning systems. They had a brighter and more modern passenger interior. Black vinyl seats were replaced by red fabric seats. Individual seats replaced the padded bench seats used on previous models. The interior colour scheme consisted of red floors, cream walls, yellow doors and panels, and brown simulated wood grain panels. The H6s replaced the original red G-class cars and were used almost exclusively on the Bloor-Danforth line, with no further H-series orders made. The H6s were similar to the H5s, but had light brown floors, and orange doors and panels. A prototype T-series car was built by UTDC in 1990–1991, and evaluated by the TTC. By the time the TTC was ready to order new cars in 1992, UTDC had been sold to Bombardier. Bombardier added new technology such as AC propulsion to a platform based on the predecessor H-series cars.

48 cars based on the H1 model were built and used for the Expo Express in Montreal, for Expo 67. 108 modified H6 cars were produced for the Ankara Metro by Bombardier from 1996 to 1997.

Retirement and future
The H1 and H2 cars were replaced by the T1-class cars. The last 12 remaining H1 cars were retired on November 29, 1999. All of the H2 cars were retired by September 28, 2001. Nearly all H1 and H2 cars were scrapped, although several H1 cars are used as subway work vehicles. Some H4 cars were retired when T1-series cars were delivered.

In 2006, the TTC placed an order with Bombardier Transportation for the first 39 articulated Toronto Rocket (TR) trains to be operated on the Yonge–University-Spadina (YUS) line. This allowed the TTC to retire the remaining H4 and H5 cars.

A contract option was exercised in 2010, when the TTC ordered 31 additional new TR trains making 70 trains in total. This allowed for the retirement of the H6 subway cars on the Bloor–Danforth line and to have enough new TR trains available for the opening of the YUS line extension to Vaughan.

With the arrival of the articulated TR trains in 2011, many T1-series trains were transferred from the YUS line to the Bloor–Danforth line. This allowed for the retirement of the H4 cars, between the fall of 2011 until January 27, 2012, when the last H4 train made its last run during the morning rush on the Bloor-Danforth line. The H4s were expected to be scrapped at Future Enterprises in Hamilton, Ontario, although some H4 cars were retained for use as maintenance trains.

The H5 trains were replaced shortly thereafter by the arrival of more TR-series trains. The last H5 train made its final service run on June 14, 2013, with a round-trip on the YUS line. That trip began at Wilson station en route to Finch station. On the return trip, the train encountered technical difficulties at Eglinton West station, meaning the train had to go out of service. While many H5 subway cars were scrapped, some cars were sent to the United States for refurbishing and were expected to be shipped to the Lagos Metropolitan Area Transport Authority of Nigeria for the Lagos Rail Mass Transit project.

The H6s were the only version of the H series still in service when, on June 20, 2014, the last H6 train took its final run on Line 2 Bloor–Danforth. The round-trip began at Greenwood station, and headed eastbound to Kennedy station, then westbound to Kipling station and back to Kennedy station where the train was decommissioned. This marked the end of all remaining H-series subway trains which had been in service with the TTC after 49 years. (The H6s were replaced by more T1s, which had been transferred from Line 1 to Line 2 following the arrival of more TR trains.) It was reported that some H6 cars were to be sold to the Lagos Metropolitan Area Transport Authority for use on a new Lagos Light Rail project (along with some of the already-retired H5 cars). However, TTC officials later announced that the deal had been cancelled. Only 75 H5 cars were shipped to Lagos following their retirement in 2013 and all of the H6s were scrapped after retirement in 2014. However, the 75 H5 cars sent to the United States were scrapped in August 2015 after Eko Rail decided to purchase newly made cars from the Chinese rolling stock company CRRC Dalian. 

 H1: 5336–5499
 H2: 5506–5575
 H3: 5500–5505 (experimental/modified versions of the H2 that led to development of the H5)
 H4: 5576–5663
 H5: 5670–5807
 H6: 5810–5935

References

External links
H1–4 series cars
H5–6 series cars

Toronto rapid transit passenger equipment
Train-related introductions in 1965
600 V DC multiple units
Electric multiple units of Canada
750 V DC multiple units